Mukunthetta Sumitra Vilikkunnu is a 1988 Indian Malayalam-language romantic comedy film directed by Priyadarshan and written by Sreenivasan. It stars Mohanlal, Sreenivasan, and Ranjini. The story is based on the Marathi play Sasa Aani Kasav (Hare and Tortoise), which was earlier adapted into the 1983 movie Katha.

Plot

Mukundan K. Kartha (Mohanlal) is a simple man, with a decent job, whose old college classmate and friend Viswanath (Sreenivasan) comes to meet him. He lives in a small residential colony  in Chennai, where there's a water shortage and the people struggle to make ends meet. The damsel of the colony, Sumithra (Ranjini) likes Mukundan. Viswanath is a fraud and con-man and he makes Mukundan and the people of his colony believe that he is an influential person and classmate of the Public Works Department minister. He makes the people believe that, due to his influence, water pipes arrived at the colony.

Viswanath befriends businessman C. P. Menon and promises to obtain an import license for Chinese leather. Viswanath uses Mukundan to obtain money from one of his other victims, which causes Mukundan to lose his job and get arrested by the police.

Viswanath even tries to steal the woman Mukundan loves, Sumitra, and plans to marry her by tricking her family into thinking that he is rich.

Viswanath goes missing when the people discover that he had tricked them all. Viswanath tries to flee to Dubai, but Mukudan catches him at the airport, and tears his flight ticket. Finally Mukundan and Sumitra confess their love and get married.

Cast
 Mohanlal as Mukundan Krishnan Kartha
 Sreenivasan as Viswanath
 Ranjini as Sumithra
 Nedumudi Venu as Kumaran Nair
 Thikkurissy Sukumaran Nair as Menon
 K.P.A.C. Lalitha as Sumithra's mother
 M. G. Soman as C. P. Menon
 Kuthiravattam Pappu as Ouseppachan
 Jagathi Sreekumar as Gopi
 Innocent as Ramankutty Nair
 Maniyanpilla Raju as Surendran
 Cochin Haneefa as  a police inspector
 Bobby Kottarakkara as a water supplier
 Thodupuzha Vasanthi as Kumaran Nair's Wife
 Jalaja as Gopi's wife
Pavithran

Soundtrack

References

External links
 

1988 films
1980s Malayalam-language films
Films with screenplays by Sreenivasan
Films directed by Priyadarshan
Films scored by Ouseppachan